Sojwe is a village in Kweneng District of Botswana. The population was 2,056 in 2001 census.

References

Kweneng District
Villages in Botswana